Volcán Tajumulco is a large stratovolcano in the department of San Marcos in western Guatemala. It is part of the mountain range of the Sierra Madre de Chiapas, which begins in Mexico's southernmost state of Chiapas.

Description

Tajumulco is composed of andesitic-dacitic lavas on the top of a large escarpment of uncertain origin. A lava flow from the north-western summit descends into a steep valley on the same side of the volcano.

The volcano's eruptive history is unclear and the date of its last eruption is unknown. Reports from the 18th and early 19th century claim to record eruptions but these are considered unlikely.

The region around Tajumulco is relatively sparsely populated. Although it is infrequently visited, the volcano can be climbed in about five hours from the hamlet of Tuichán. Views are variable as the area is frequently covered in mist and cloud, with conditions at their least favorable between April and September.

See also

List of mountain peaks of North America
List of mountain peaks of Central America
List of volcanoes in Guatemala
List of elevation extremes by country

Notes

References

External links

Sierra Madre de Chiapas
San Marcos Department
Volcan Tajumulco
Volcano
Tajumulco
Volcan Tajumulco
Highest points of countries